

Ansal Plaza, Delhi
Ansal Plaza, Delhi is the oldest major shopping mall of Delhi as well as the third oldest in India. It was opened on 1 November 1999 with the launch of Shoppers Stop in Delhi (its first branch to be part of a mall, now Decathlon Khel Gaon). The mall has an amphitheatre enclaved within the circular shaped plaza. It has parking facilities for 1000 cars. After the success of Ansal Plaza, Delhi, AIMS Ansals opened many more malls in several places of India.

Ansal Crown Plaza, Faridabad
Ansal Crown Plaza is one of the biggest malls of Faridabad. It is located on Mathura Road in Sector-15A and close to Neelam Chowk Ajronda metro station.

Ansal Plaza, Ludhiana

Ansal Plaza, Ludhiana is located on Ferozepur Road in Gurdev Nagar, Ludhiana.

Ansal Plaza, Ghaziabad
Ansal Plaza, Ghaziabad was inaugurated in 2005 and it is one of the oldest malls of Ghaziabad. It is located near Dabur Chowk at Vaishali.

Ansal Plaza, Gurgaon
Ansal Plaza, Gurgaon is located in Palam Vihar, an upscale locality of Gurgaon. The mall is close to Rezang La Chowk in Sector-23.

Ansal Royal Plaza, Jodhpur
Ansal Royal Plaza was inaugurated in 2007 and it is one of the oldest malls of Jodhpur. It is located on High Court Road, close to Nai Sarak Chauraha.

Ansal Highway Plaza, Sonipat
Ansal Highway Plaza is located at Sector-62 in Kundli, Sonipat.

Ansal Plaza, Greater Noida
Ansal Plaza, Greater Noida is the first shopping mall of Greater Noida. It is located at Pari Chowk in Amit Nagar.

References

Shopping malls in Delhi
Buildings and structures completed in 1999
South Delhi district
1999 establishments in Delhi
20th-century architecture in India